Per Einarsson (born May 1, 1984) is a Swedish Bandy player who currently plays for Vetlanda BK as a midfielder.

Per has only played for Vetlanda BK where he began playing professionally in 2000.

External links
  per einarsson at bandysidan
  vetlanda bk

Swedish bandy players
Living people
1984 births
Hammarby IF Bandy players
Vetlanda BK players
Place of birth missing (living people)
21st-century Swedish people